Trattoria Records was a Japanese record company formed by Keigo Oyamada in 1993. The record company was founded by Keigo Oyamada in 1993 and it was owned by Polystar, a group of independent record labels.

The label was defunct in 2002, and most of their artists went to the Felicity label.

Current roster 
Keigo Oyamada
Louis Philippe

Catalog 
Apples in Stereo
Asa-Chang & Junray
Bridge
Citrus
Corduroy
Hanatarash
Hideki Kaji
Hiromix
Kahimi Karie
Takako Minekawa
OOIOO
Papas Fritas
Salon Music
Seagull Screaming Kiss Her Kiss Her
Vodka Collins
Wack Wack Rhythm Band
Would-be-goods
Bill Wyman - Reissue

See also
List of record labels

References

External links
Trattoria Records release catalog 
Polystar - Trattoria Records's parent label 

Japanese record labels